The 1980–81 season was Paris Saint-Germain's 11th season in existence. PSG played their home league games at the Parc des Princes in Paris, registering an average attendance of 22,969 spectators per match. The club was presided by Francis Borelli and the team was coached by Georges Peyroche. Dominique Bathenay was the team captain.

Summary

PSG transferred João Alves to Benfica in 1980–81, but signed Saint-Étienne winger Dominique Rocheteau, who joined to play as center forward. Led by an attacking trio made up of Rocheteau himself, Nambatingue Toko and Boubacar Sarr, with Mustapha Dahleb pulling the strings from the number 10 position, PSG managed their most promising season so far. The Red and Blues finished 5th in the league, narrowly missing out on European football but establishing themselves as a top-half team with Georges Peyroche at the helm. Despite being eliminated on away goals, another highlight was the club's anthology French Cup victory against Nantes at the Parc des Princes (5–3).

Players 

As of the 1980–81 season.

Squad

Out on loan

Transfers 

As of the 1980–81 season.

Arrivals

Departures

Kits 

French radio RTL was the shirt sponsor. French sportswear brand Le Coq Sportif was the kit manufacturer.

Friendly tournaments

Tournoi de Troyes

Competitions

Overview

Division 1

League table

Results by round

Matches

Coupe de France

Round of 64

Round of 32

Statistics 

As of the 1980–81 season.

Appearances and goals 

|-
!colspan="16" style="background:#dcdcdc; text-align:center"|Goalkeepers

|-
!colspan="16" style="background:#dcdcdc; text-align:center"|Defenders

|-
!colspan="16" style="background:#dcdcdc; text-align:center"|Midfielders

|-
!colspan="16" style="background:#dcdcdc; text-align:center"|Forwards

|-

References

External links 

Official websites
 PSG.FR - Site officiel du Paris Saint-Germain
 Paris Saint-Germain - Ligue 1 
 Paris Saint-Germain - UEFA.com

Paris Saint-Germain F.C. seasons
Association football clubs 1980–81 season
French football clubs 1980–81 season